John Willard "Jack" Turner (June 5, 1939 – May 5, 2013) was a National Basketball Association (NBA) player for the Chicago Packers. He was drafted with the ninth pick in the second round of the 1961 NBA Draft by the Chicago Packers. In his one NBA season, Turner averaged 4.8 points per game, 2.0 rebounds per game and 1.0 assist per game.

Turner died on May 5, 2013, at the age of 73.

Turner still ranks eighth all-time at the University of Louisville in both career scoring average (16.9 ppg) and career rebounding average (10.6 rpg)

References

1939 births
2013 deaths
Basketball players from Kentucky
Chicago Packers draft picks
Chicago Packers players
Forwards (basketball)
Guards (basketball)
Louisville Cardinals men's basketball players
American men's basketball players